Abacops is a genus of beetle in the family Carabidae; its only species is Abacops rugipennis.

References

Pterostichinae
Monotypic Carabidae genera